Silje Mathisen (born 15 February 2001) is a Norwegian former professional racing cyclist, who rode professionally for UCI Women's Continental Team  in 2020 and 2021. In October 2020, she rode in the 2020 Tour of Flanders for Women's race in Belgium.

References

External links

2001 births
Living people
Norwegian female cyclists
Place of birth missing (living people)
21st-century Norwegian women